Marc De Block (born 25 July 1945) is a Belgian former professional racing cyclist. He rode in the 1969 Tour de France. He also won the Belgian National Cyclo-cross Championships in 1976 and 1977.

References

External links
 

1945 births
Living people
Belgian male cyclists
Cyclo-cross cyclists
Belgian cyclo-cross champions
People from Merelbeke
Cyclists from East Flanders